In ancient times, a method of infanticide or at least child abandonment was to leave infants in a wild place, either to die due to hypothermia, hunger, thirst, or animal attack, or perhaps to be collected and brought up by those unable to produce their own children.

Mythological
This form of child abandonment is a recurring theme in mythology, especially among hero births.

Some examples include:
 Sargon, King of Akkad – exposed to the river.
 Karna – exposed to the river.
 Tang Sanzang – exposed to the river on a wooden plank. The historical person he is based on never suffered such a fate.
 Moses – exposed to the river Nile on a basket.
 Oedipus – exposed in the mountains.
 Paris – exposed at the top of Mount Ida.
 Zāl – exposed in the Alborz mountains. 
 Telephus – exposed on Mount Parthenion.
 Atalanta – exposed on Mount Parthenion.
 Perseus – boxed and cast into the sea with his mother, Danaë.
 Gilgamesh – thrown from the acropolis.
 Romulus and Remus – exposed in a tub to the Tiber River.
 Siegfried – exposed in a glass vessel to the river.
 Ken Arok, Javanese king – exposed to the river.
 Momotarō (桃太郎, "Peach Boy") – found inside of a giant peach, floating down a river.
 Mess Búachalla - exposed to wild beasts.

Following exposure, the infants commonly died or were taken by slavers.

Sparta
According to Plutarch, in his "The Life of Lycurgus: 

Offspring was not reared at the will of the father, but was taken and carried by him to a place called Lesche, where the elders of the tribes officially examined the infant, and if it was well-built and sturdy, they ordered the father to rear it, and assigned it one of the nine thousand lots of land; but if it was ill-born and deformed, they sent it to the so‑called Apothetae, a chasm-like place at the foot of Mount Taÿgetus, in the conviction that the life of that which nature had not well equipped at the very beginning for health and strength, was of no advantage either to itself or the state.

However, this story has little other literary support. Modern excavations at the spot have found only adult human bones – it may have been used as a place for execution of criminals.

 Early Middle Ages 
During the Early Middle Ages in Europe, the History of European Morals (1869) by Irish historian William Lecky mentions that infant exposure was not punishable by law and was practiced on a large scale and was considered a pardonable offense. In the 8th century, foundling hospitals were opened in Milan, Florence and Rome, among others, to help reduce the deaths of newborns who were subjected to exposure. Church authorities were in charge of this social issue until the 16th century.

 Interpretation 

Otto Rank explores this topic in his book, The Myth of the Birth of the Hero''.  The exposure, especially in water, "signifies no more and no less than the symbolic expression of birth.  The children come out of the water.  The basket, box, or receptacle simply means the container, the womb; so that the exposure directly signifies the process of birth".

Further, according to Rank, these myths epitomize the natural psychological tension between parent and child.  In all these stories there exists "a tendency to represent the parents as the first and most powerful opponents of the hero .... The vital peril, thus concealed in the representation of birth through exposure, actually exists in the process of birth itself.  The overcoming of all these obstacles also expresses the idea that the future hero has actually overcome the greatest difficulties by virtue of his birth, for he has victoriously thwarted all attempts to prevent it."

See also

Feral children in mythology and fiction
Infanticide

References 

Infanticide